Bonnières-sur-Seine (literally Bonnières on Seine) is a commune in the Yvelines department in north-central France.

See also
Communes of the Yvelines department

References

Communes of Yvelines